The Herschel Walker trade was the largest player trade in the history of the National Football League (NFL). This deal on October 12, 1989, centered on sending running back Herschel Walker from the Dallas Cowboys to the Minnesota Vikings. Including Walker and a transaction involving the San Diego Chargers, the trade eventually involved 18 players and draft picks. At the time of the deal, the Cowboys were one of the worst teams in the league (the team finished the 1989 season with its worst post-merger record, 1–15), trading away their best player, while the Vikings believed that Walker was the missing piece they needed to make a Super Bowl run. Thus, Minnesota originally felt that they got the better end of the deal. Instead, the Cowboys used the draft picks acquired in this trade to get the players they needed to help them win three Super Bowls in the 1990s. Meanwhile, the Vikings did not make a Super Bowl appearance with Walker.

Background
In his book, Greatest Team Ever: The Dallas Cowboys Dynasty of the 1990s, author Norm Hitzges chronicled the Herschel Walker trade. Four games into the 1989 season, Jimmy Johnson, then the new head coach of the Dallas Cowboys (having taken over for Tom Landry that season), came up with the idea to trade Walker while on a morning jog with his staff. Johnson felt the Cowboys' poor performance could only be remedied by a blockbuster trade. He briefly considered trading wide receiver Michael Irvin to the Los Angeles Raiders, but Raiders owner Al Davis essentially talked Johnson out of the trade by saying, "You sure you want to do that? Who is going to catch passes for you?" Johnson felt that Walker was the only remaining bargaining chip they had.

A number of teams contacted the Cowboys when they announced that they would trade Walker. The New York Giants were among the first teams to express interest. Walker had started his professional career at the Meadowlands with the New Jersey Generals during the United States Football League's three-year run and was amenable to a return to Giants Stadium; however, the trade would have been unfavorable for Dallas since both teams were in the NFC East division. The Atlanta Falcons entered into negotiations, but eventually pulled out over fear of Walker's future contract demands. The most serious offer came from the Cleveland Browns.

Johnson stated, "[The Browns] offered us a player, a couple of future number one draft picks and three number two draft picks." The Cowboys felt this was a favorable offer, but they also felt that if another team were to enter the discussion, then they could generate a bidding war and thereby get even more compensation. Jimmy Johnson and team owner Jerry Jones decided to contact other clubs to generate buzz and create leverage. Johnson contacted Minnesota Vikings general manager Mike Lynn. Johnson told Lynn that he was going to trade Walker to Cleveland that afternoon, and that if Minnesota would like to trade for Walker, then it would cost them "players, draft picks, conditional picks, and provisions", giving Lynn a deadline of 6:30 p.m.

The Vikings were trying to make their first Super Bowl appearance since Super Bowl XI. In the previous two years, the Vikings lost to the Washington Redskins in the 1988 NFC Championship Game and lost to the San Francisco 49ers in the Divisional Playoffs in the 1988–89 NFL playoffs. Lynn, feeling Walker was the missing piece to a Super Bowl run, faxed Johnson that he was interested, and soon after negotiations ensued. In order to get Walker to agree to a trade, the Cowboys paid him a $1.25 million "exit bonus".

Timeline
In the original proposal, Dallas agreed to give Herschel Walker and three draft picks to Minnesota. In exchange, the Cowboys would get from the Vikings five players, three draft picks, and conditional picks attached to each of those five players should they be cut by Dallas before February 1, 1990:

One of those players that Minnesota agreed to send to Dallas, Darrin Nelson, refused to report to the Cowboys. Dallas then agreed to trade Nelson to the San Diego Chargers for their fifth-round pick in 1990, which the Cowboys promptly sent to the Vikings. In total, this revised trade involved 18 players and draft picks (with the revised transactions involving San Diego in bold):

The Vikings had originally assumed that they got the better end of the deal, not knowing at the time that head coach Jimmy Johnson was interested only in the draft picks and not the players. At a press conference after the trade, Johnson bragged that he committed "The Great Train Robbery," but was criticized by various sports writers such as Randy Galloway of The Dallas Morning News.

Johnson waived Stewart in November 1989, then told his coaches to not start Solomon, Howard or Holt, signaling to the rest of the league his intention to claim the draft picks. Vikings General Manager Mike Lynn eventually made another deal, letting the Cowboys keep the three players and all the conditional picks.

Aftermath and legacy
Dallas used Minnesota's picks over the succeeding years to make trades with other teams around the NFL. The picks acquired in those were then used to draft players such as Emmitt Smith, Darren Woodson, and Russell Maryland. These players would help the Cowboys win multiple Super Bowls. In other words, the trade of Walker to the Vikings contributed largely to the Cowboys' success in the early 1990s. For this reason, it has been called one of the most lopsided trades in sports history.

Meanwhile, the 1989 Vikings were eliminated in the Divisional Playoffs by the eventual Super Bowl XXIV champion San Francisco 49ers for the second consecutive year. Among the four players that the Vikings selected using Dallas's picks from the trade, Mike Jones only spent two seasons with the team, and Jake Reed spent eight seasons. And in 1991, the Vikings re-signed Darrin Nelson, the player who forced Minnesota and Dallas to send him to San Diego in 1989, to backup Walker; Nelson retired after two seasons.

Still, the Vikings have not made a Super Bowl appearance since the trade. Walker would play only two more seasons with the Vikings who failed to make the playoffs in both years. Walker then signed with the Philadelphia Eagles for the 1992 season and with the New York Giants in the 1995 season, and rejoined the Cowboys for the 1996 season.

Seventeen years later in 2007, the trade was still an easy target for satire: one ESPN columnist, assessing the impact of free agency on the NFL (instituted in 1993), noted that it had almost entirely replaced significant trades and by doing so "took away one of the greatest shortcuts to becoming a Super Bowl champion: fleecing the Vikings."

The trade was detailed in an ESPN 30 for 30 film, "The Great Trade Robbery".

See also
Brock for Broglio
White Flag Trade
Eric Lindros trade
Jerome Bettis trade
Ricky Williams trade
List of largest National Football League trades

References

Dallas Cowboys
Minnesota Vikings
San Diego Chargers
1989 in sports in Texas
1989 in sports in Minnesota
1989 in sports in California
Sports trades
1989 National Football League season